The Merciless is a 2017 South Korean crime-action film directed by Byun Sung-hyun, and starring Sol Kyung-gu and Yim Si-wan. The film was released in South Korea on May 17, 2017. It was shown out of competition in the Midnight Screenings section at the 70th Cannes Film Festival on May 24, 2017.

Plot
The story is about the loyalty and betrayal between an inmate leader and an undercover cop/prisoner, who team to take over a gang.
It centers around the main character Hyun soo, the undercover cop, and Han Jaeho the inmate leader.

Cast
Sol Kyung-gu as Jae-ho
Yim Si-wan as Hyun-soo 
Kim Hee-won as Byung-gab 
Jeon Hye-jin as Chun In-sook 
Lee Geung-young as Byung-chul 
Jang In-sub as Min-chul  
Kim Ji-hoon as Jung-sik   
Lee Ji-hoon as Public prosecutor Oh
Choi Byung-mo as Captain Choi
Moon Ji-yoon as Young-geun 
Nam Gi-ae as Hyun-soo's mother
Jin Seon-kyu as Prison Security Section Chief

Special appearance
Heo Joon-ho as Kim Sung-han

Cameo
Shin So-yul as Osean Trading advertisement beauty 1 
Kim Bo-mi as Osean Trading advertisement beauty 2
Lee Mi-so as Osean Trading advertisement beauty 3
Kim Sung-oh as Jung Seung-pil

Release
Prior to its local release, the film has been pre-sold to 85 countries including France, the Netherlands, Belgium, Japan, Australia, India, Taiwan, the Philippines and Singapore at the 2017 Hong Kong Film Mart.
 According to the distributor CJ Entertainment the film was later sold to additional territories, reaching a total of 117 countries worldwide.

The film was released in French cinemas on June 28, 2017, by ARP Distributors.

Reception
The film received a seven-minute standing ovation at the 2017 Cannes Film Festival.

Michele Halberstadt from ARP Films praised the film for its screenwriting, direction and characters.

According to the Korean Film Council, the film topped the Korean box office on the first day of release and sold 95,261 tickets.

Adaptation

On December 28, 2017, CJ E&M, the production company of The Merciless, announced a television adaptation of the film. According to the company, the script will be written in 2018, and the drama would be produced in 2019.

Awards and nominations

References

External links

2017 films
2010s prison films
South Korean crime drama films
South Korean action drama films
2017 crime drama films
2017 crime action films
2017 action drama films
South Korean prison films
Films about organized crime in South Korea
CJ Entertainment films
South Korean crime action films
2010s South Korean films